English Female Artists, in two volumes, assembled and edited by Ellen Creathorne Clayton, lists an overview of prominent English women painters up to 1876, the year of publication.

The purpose of the book was to provide "a roll call of honorable names." The book is a useful reference work for anyone studying British women's art.

Volume I (historical female artists)
Susannah Hornebolt and Levina Teerlinc
Anne Carlisle, Artemisia Gentileschi, The Sisters Cleyn
Anna Maria Carew, Elizabeth Neale, Mary More, Mrs. Boardman, Elizabeth Creed
Mary Beale, Susan Penelope Rosse, Anne Killigrew, Maria Verelst, Anne, Princess of Orange, Princess Caroline, Agatha van der Mijn, Sarah Hoadly, Elizabeth Blackwell, Mary Delany, Frances Reynolds, Angelica Kauffman, Mary Moser, Maria Cosway, Mary Harrison, Anna Maria Charretie, Adelaide Agnes Maguire

Volume II (contemporary artists)

The second volume is a list of biographies of women active in the 19th century, most of whom were contemporaries whose works were known to the author. It is grouped by painting genre and includes an appendix of amateurs and women who were "Honorary Members" of the "Society of Lady Artists". The second volume also includes the index for both volumes.

Figure painters
Helen Allingham, Laura Alma-Tadema, Sophie Anderson, Edith Courtauld-Arendrup, Margaret Backhouse, Julia Behr, Kate Bisschop-Swift, Agnes Rose Bouvier Nicholl, Alice Boyd, Adelaide Claxton, Rebecca Coleman, Fanny Corbaux, Mary Ann Criddle, Mary Ellen Edwards, Eliza Bridell Fox, Margaret Gillies, Nellie Gosse, Catherine Hueffer (sister of Mrs. WM Rossetti), Elizabeth Jerichau, Louise Jopling, Helen Jane Arundel Miles, Elizabeth Murray, Lucy Madox Brown (Mrs. WM Rossetti), Sarah Setchel, Rebecca Solomon, Catherine Adeline Sparks, Louisa Starr, Marie Spartali-Stillman, Ellen Stone, Elizabeth Thompson, Mary S. Tovey, Eliza Turck, Augusta Walker, Henrietta, and her daughters Eva and Flora

Landscape painters
Barbara Bodichon, Eleanor Brown, Marian Emma Chase, Marian Croft, Susan Elizabeth Gay, Mary Gow, Alice Elfrida Manly, Madeline Marrable, Anna Blunden Martino, Clara Montalba, Emma Sophia Oliver, Elizabeth Phillips, Louise, Rose, and Margaret Rayner, Frances Redgrave, Harriette Anne Seymour, Norah and Ellen Vernon, Hilda Annetta Walker, Sophie S. Warren, Linnie Watt

Portrait and miniature painters, painters on enamel, etc.
Maria Burt, Grace Cruickshank, Annie Dixon, Charlotte Grace Dixon, Ellen Hill, Ellen Montalba, Margaret Tekusch, Margaret Thomas

Painters of flowers, fruit, and still life
Helen Cordelia Angell, Emma Wren Cooper, May Corkling, Mary Ann Duffield, Anna Maria Fitz James, Anna Maria Guerin, Maria Harrison, Teresa Hegg de Lauderset, Florence Lewis, Agnes MacWhirter, Martha Darley Mutrie and Annie Feray Mutrie, Joanna Samworth, Susanna Soden, Eloise Harriet Stannard, Mary and Florence Vernon, Emma Walter

Animal painters
Hannah Bolton Barlow, Emily Desvignes, Frances C. Fairman, Katharine King, Mary Louisa Kirschner, Gertrude Jekyll, Frances Fripp Rossiter, Hilda Annetta Walker.

Humorous designers
Georgina Bowers, Ellen Creathorne Clayton, Adelaide Claxton, Marie Duval

Decorative artists
Elizabeth Campbell Collingridge, Emily Edwards (sister of Mrs. Sparkes), Louisa, Marchioness of Waterford, Priscilla Anne, Countess of Westmorland, Marion Margaret, Viscountess Alford, Lady Anne Loftus, Eleanor Vere Boyle, Lady Duckett, Lady Dunbar, Mrs. Hugh Blackburn, Mrs. Higford Burr, Mrs. Patty Harding, Mrs. Hussey, Mrs. Frank Johnstone Mitchell, Mrs. Pfeiffer, Mrs. Harriet Olivia Boddington

References

Volume I on archive.org
Volume II on archive.org

Lists of painters
1876 non-fiction books
Lists of British women artists
Biographical dictionaries of women
History of women in the United Kingdom